Catfights and Spotlights is the sixth studio album by British girl group Sugababes, released by Island Records on 17 October 2008. Produced primarily by Klas Åhlund, Steve Booker and Orson, the album also features additional contribution from Si Hulbert, The Invisible Men, Melvin Kuiters, and Max Martin. It is the group's final album to include remaining founding member Keisha Buchanan, until 2022's The Lost Tapes.

The album received a generally positive reception from the media and music critics, but became the group's third lowest-charting and second lowest-selling album, reaching number eight and the top twenty in the UK and on the Irish Albums Chart, respectively. Catfights and Spotlights spawned only two singles, with the international top ten entry "Girls". The second and final single "No Can Do" was released on 22 December 2008.

Recording and theme 
After they had completed their Change Tour in May 2008, the Sugababes announced that they would not go back into the recording studio until September 2008 to work on their next album, insisting they needed more time to work on their new material for a 2009 release. However, in June 2008, band member Keisha Buchanan told an interviewer that the group would start work on a new album straight away due to opportunities to record with new producers, and by 17 June the trio had started recording. Production was fast tracked after Italian musicians Melvin Kuiters and Si Hulbert brought Island Records a new track based around a sample of Ernie K. Doe's classic soul-funk song "Here Come the Girls" which was considered "a perfect vehicle" for the Sugababes sixth studio album. Less than a month later at the annual Liverpool Summer Pops in Liverpool, they announced that the lead single was completed, describing it as "amazing". The title of the single, "Girls", was revealed on 11 August 2008.

The album has been described as having a "funkier" sound by Orson's lead singer Jason Pebworth, who has been working with the group in the recording studio. In an interview, the Sugababes described the Catfights and Spotlights as having a more mellow and mature sound which focuses mainly on their vocals. The album was also described by Range as darker.

Critical reception 

AllMusic editor Matthew Chisling called Catfights and Spotlights the ″group's strongest showing to date″. He felt that the album took the band "into a new dimension of artistic merit, flashing impeccable songwriting skills and flourishing arrangements thanks to the help of immaculate production, which throws the girl into a retro bodysuit yet never feels stale [...] Catfights and Spotlights is the true reflection of a girl group's transition from shallow pop stardom into full-fledged recording artistry." Lucy Davies from BBC Music found that the album "bounds out like a Kate Moss Rimmel ad, all metallic, sharp-sure and savvy", and added: "The trouble with the Sugababes' sound has always been keeping the balance between blending and preserving individuality, and they've managed it here on the whole." Digital Spys Nick Levine remarked that "Catfights and Spotlights is mellower and more classic-sounding than previous Sugababes records, with loads of strings and a conspicuous lack of synths, but it's no less polished and commercially-minded." Popjustice called Catfights and Spotlights "the most 'complete' Sugababes album since their first."

In his review for The Guardian, Dorian Lynskey noted "a general transition from crisp modernity towards self-consciously grown-up, Duffyesque soul". Indeed, half of it is as colourless as promised, but the half credited to Swedish songwriter/producer Klas Ahlund is unflaggingly terrific [...] Sugababes have always lacked a reliably sympathetic ally who can pull the best from them: a Xenomania to their Girls Aloud. In Ahlund, they might just have found one." The Times reviewer Priya found that "Sugababes are attempting to put some electricity back into their sound" with the album. While he felt, that the band "make the 1960s sound their own [and] recall the urban angst that made us fall in love with them [...] the throaty-voiced Amelle Berrabah is no replacement for the soulful, feisty pipes of the former member Mutya Buena." Planet Sound felt that "mainly working with new producers has mixed success for the girlband". The Teletext music page noted "too many ballads" on the album, "but just enough singles here not to disrupt momentum". Elan Mark Edwards from The Sunday Times wrote, that "there are 14 tracks on Catfights and Spotlights, and there isn't a single turkey among them".

Sales and impact 
Catfights and Spotlights debuted at number eight on the UK Albums Chart with first week sales of over 23,000 copies, becoming their fifth studio album to reach the top ten in the United Kingdom. However, it also became their first album since their debut One Touch (2000) not to peak inside the national top three. The album fell out of the top fifty in its fourth week of release. In the week of 19 January, the album jumped 22 places from 96 to 74 with sales 2,000. Catfights and Spotlights was eventually certified Gold by the British Phonographic Industry (BPI) on 7 November 2008. In Ireland, the album debuted at number 18, before falling to number 42 the following week. As with the UK, it became the group's lowest-charting album and first album to miss the top ten since One Touch. In Greece, the album entered at number 33, before dropping to number 37 the following week. However, on its third week the album climbed to number 22.

In an interview with Daily Star Sunday, Sugababes member Range blamed their music label, Island Records, for disappointing sales of Catfights and Spotlights. According to Range, "The sales have been disappointing but I don't think it is a reflection on the album's quality, and the problem is the promotion, I don't actually think our fans know we've even got an album out." In a 2009 interview with The Guardian, Buchanan further elaborated: "We're still really proud of [Catfights and Spotlights], even though it wasn't our most successful album [...] I was surprised – I think Change should've got those bad reviews, because that was a lot poppier. With Catfights, we decided to go a bit old-school and stripped-back. But if we stayed in the place we were in, we'd never move on."

Track listing 

Notes
 "All international versions of Catfights and Spotlights exclude She's like a Star, with some international versions replacing it with the single and radio version of Girls.

Sampling
 "Girls" contains elements of Ernie K-Doe's "Here Come the Girls", as written by Allen Toussaint.
 "No Can Do" contains a sample of "Yes, It's You" written by Nugetre.

Charts

Certifications

Release history

References 

2008 albums
Albums produced by Klas Åhlund
Island Records albums
Sugababes albums